Obhur Creek, or Sharm Abḥur (شرم ابحر, between latitude
21°42'11" and 21°45'24" and longitude 39°05'12" and
39°08'48"E) is a creek located on the eastern side of the Red Sea, near Jeddah, Saudi Arabia. 
The creek is a popular place for Red Sea marinas. The Jeddah Tower, a tower set to be the tallest building in the world at some point, will overlook the creek along with the Red Sea.

Characteristics
The creek has the following characteristics:

 High temperature
 Salinity
 Surface water consists of plankton

References

Rivers of Saudi Arabia
Geography of Jeddah